This is an incomplete list of University of Adelaide people including notable alumni and staff associated with the University of Adelaide in Australia.

Alumni

Business

 Shaun Bonett – founder of the Precision Group
 John Langdon Bonython – founding chairman of Santos
 Bruce Carter – chairman of ASC Pty Ltd
 Cheong Choong Kong – former chief executive officer of Singapore Airlines, chairman of Oversea-Chinese Banking Corporation
 Tim Cooper – managing director of Coopers Brewery
 Simon Hackett – founder of Internode (ISP)
 Tim Harcourt – economist
 Edward Holden – managing director of General Motors-Holden
 Wayne Jackson – former chief executive officer of the Australian Football League (AFL) 
 Lim Siong Guan – group president of the Government of Singapore Investment Corporation
 Gillon McLachlan – chief executive officer of the AFL 
 Thorburn Brailsford Robertson – pioneered insulin manufacture in Australia
 Bo Songvisava, chef and restaurateur
 John Spalvins – managing director of the Adelaide Steamship Company
 Raymond Spencer – chair of the South Australian Economic Development Board 
 Neil Weste – microelectronics engineer and entrepreneur
 Philip Wollen – former Vice President Citibank; General Manager at Citicorp, Philanthropist
 Wan Zulkiflee – chairman of Malaysia Airlines, former president and chief executive officer of Petronas

Government

Heads of state

 Frances Adamson – Governor 2022–present
 Roma Mitchell – Australia's first female judge; its first female Governor 1991–1996
 Eric Neal – business leader, Governor 1996–2001
 Mark Oliphant – physicist; Governor 1971–1976
 Keith Seaman – Uniting Church minister; Governor 1977–1982
 Hieu Van Le – Lieutenant Governor of South Australia 2007–2014; Governor 2014–present

Politicians

National leaders

Australia
 Julia Gillard – 27th Prime Minister of Australia (2009–2012) (attended 1979 to 1982, transferred to the University of Melbourne)

All other countries
 Peter Ong Boon Kwee – Head of the Civil Service, Singapore since 2010, the Permanent Secretary of the Ministry of Finance, Singapore since 2009, and Permanent Secretary with Special Duties in the Prime Minister's Office, Singapore
 Ong Teng Cheong – 5th President of Singapore (1993–1999)
 Joseph Pairin Kitingan – 7th Chief Minister of Sabah, Malaysia (1985–1994)
 Abdul Taib – 4th Chief Minister of Sarawak, Malaysia (1981–2014); Governor of Sarawak (2014–)
 Adenan Satem – 5th Chief Minister of Sarawak, Malaysia (2014–2017)
 Tony Tan Keng Yam – 7th President of Singapore (2011–2017); Deputy Prime Minister of Singapore (1995–2005)

South Australian premiers

 Lynn Arnold – Premier of South Australia 1992–1993
 John Bannon – Premier of South Australia 1982–1992
 Henry Barwell – Premier of South Australia 1920–1924
 Dean Brown – Premier of South Australia 1993–1996
 Don Dunstan – Premier of South Australia 1967–1968, and 1970–1979
 Rob Kerin – Premier of South Australia 2001–2002
 Peter Malinauskas – Premier of South Australia 2022–
 David Tonkin – Premier of South Australia 1979–1982
 Jay Weatherill – Premier of South Australia 2011–2018

Other Federal politicians

 Benjamin Benny – Senator for South Australia (1920–1926)
 Gordon Bilney – Member for Kingston (1983–1996), former minister
 Simon Birmingham – Senator for South Australia (2007–), former minister
 Julie Bishop – Member for Curtin (1998–), former minister
 Mark Bishop – Senator for Western Australia (1996–2014)
 Nick Bolkus – Senator for South Australia (1981–2005), former minister
 Mark Butler – Member for Hindmarsh (2007–), current minister
 Peter Duncan – Member for Makin (1984–1996), former minister
 Don Farrell – Senator for South Australia (2008–2014, 2016–), current minister
 Janine Haines – Senator for South Australia (1977–1978, 1981–1990)
 Sarah Hanson-Young – Senator for South Australia (2008–)
 Robert Hill – Senator for South Australia (1981–2006), former minister, and Permanent Representative of Australia to the United Nations
 Annette Hurley – Senator for South Australia (2005–2011)
 Linda Kirk – Senator for South Australia (2002–2008)
 Keith Laught – Senator for South Australia (1951–1969)
 Alexander McLachlan – Senator for South Australia (1926–1944), Postmaster-General
 Andrew Nikolic – Member for Bass (2013–2016)
 Christopher Pyne – Member for Sturt (1993–), former minister
 Margaret Reid – Senator for the Australian Capital Territory (1981–2003)
 Andrew Southcott – Member for Boothby (1996–2016)
 Natasha Stott Despoja – Senator for South Australia (1995–2008), Leader of the Australian Democrats (2001–2002)
 Amanda Vanstone – Senator for South Australia (1984–2007), former minister, Ambassador to Italy (2007–2010)
 David Vigor – Senator for South Australia (1984–1987)
 Keith Wilson – Senator for South Australia (1938–1944), Member for Sturt (1949–1954, 1955–1966)
 Penny Wong – Senator for South Australia (2002–), current minister
 Nick Xenophon – Senator for South Australia (2008–2018)

Other state and territory politicians

 Adair Blain – Member for the Northern Territory (1934–1949)
 Pru Goward – Member of the New South Wales Legislative Assembly, current minister
 Shane Stone – Chief Minister of the Northern Territory (1995–1999)
 Ian Wilson – Member for Sturt (1966–1969, 1972–1993), former minister

Other politician figures

 David Combe – former Secretary of the Australian Labor Party
 Lynton Crosby – campaign strategist and co-founder of the Crosby Textor Group
 Lim Soo Hoon – first female Permanent Secretary of Singapore
 Raymond Lim – Member of Parliament of Singapore (2001–2015), Minister for Transport
 Parameshwara Gangadharaiah – Deputy Chief Minister of Karnataka
 Lockwood Smith – Member of the New Zealand Parliament (1984–2013), Speaker of the New Zealand House of Representatives, High Commissioner of New Zealand to the United Kingdom

Public servants

 Finlay Crisp – public servant, academic and political scientist
 John Menadue – Secretary of the Department of Prime Minister and Cabinet
 Martin Parkinson – Secretary of the Department of the Treasury
 John E. Scanlon – Secretary General of CITES

Diplomats

 Richard Broinowski – Australian Ambassador to Mexico (1994–1997)
 Walter Crocker – diplomat and writer
 Maurice de Rohan – South Australian Agent General in London (1998–2006)
 Tim George – Australian diplomat
 Ivan Shearer – Member of the United Nations Human Rights Committee, former Dean of Adelaide and Sydney University Law Schools
 Sim Cheok Lim – Singaporean diplomat

Military
Brigadier Arthur Seaforth Blackburn  – soldier and lawyer; awarded the Victoria Cross in 1916
Brigadier Andrew Nikolic (see under Politics, Legislators)

Humanities

Arts

 Robyn Archer – performer and director
 Julian Cochran – composer
 Ruby Davy – pianist and composer
 John Dowie – painter and sculptor
 Francis Greenslade – comedian
 Robert Hannaford – realist artist
 Mark Holden – singer, actor, television personality and barrister
 Graham Jenkin – poet, composer and historian
 Graeme Koehne – composer
 Dichen Lachman – actress
 Anthony "Lehmo" Lehmann – comedian
 Lionel Logue – speech and language therapist and stage actor who successfully treated King George VI
 Gary McCaffrie – comedy writer and producer
 Shaun Micallef – comedian and writer
 Keith Mitchell – film and television actor
 Steve J. Spears – playwright and director
 Stephen Whittington – composer, pianist and writer on music

History
 Geoffrey Dutton – author and historian
Anne Philomena O'Brien – author and historian
 Russel Ward – historian and author of The Australian Legend

Journalism and media

 Keith Conlon – television and radio presenter
 Annabel Crabb – political writer and commentator
 Zoe Daniel – ABC foreign correspondent
 Chris Dore –  editor in chief of The Australian
 Fran Kelly – journalist and political correspondent 
 Christian Kerr – political commentator and journalist
 Samantha Maiden – national political editor of News Corporation Sunday papers
 Hamish McLachlan – television sports commentator for the Seven Network
 David Penberthy – editor-in-chief of The Daily Telegraph
 Angela Pippos – ABC sports journalist
 Michael Stutchbury – editor-in-chief of The Australian Financial Review
 Anne Summers – feminist writer and commentator

Literature, writing and poetry

 Georgia Blain – author
 James Bradley – author
 John Jefferson Bray – poet and jurist
 Nancy Cato – author
 Garry Disher – author
 Brian Elliott – academic
 Anna Goldsworthy – writer and classical pianist
 Kerryn Goldsworthy – writer and critic
 Peter Goldsworthy – author
 Max Harris – Angry Penguins poet and publisher
 Rex Ingamells – poet and founder of the Jindyworobak Movement
 Joe Penhall – playwright
 Colin Thiele – writer 
 Sean Williams – science fiction author

Philosophy and theology
 David Chalmers – philosopher and Federation Fellow
 Margaret Somerville – ethicist

Judiciary and the law

 Amanda Banton – lawyer
 John Basten – Justice of the New South Wales Court of Appeal
 Richard Blackburn – former Chief Justice of the Australian Capital Territory
 Catherine Branson – former President of the Australian Human Rights Commission and Justice of the Federal Court of Australia
 John Bray – Chief Justice of the Supreme Court of South Australia, poet and classicist
 James Crawford – legal academic; Judge of the International Court of Justice (2014)
 Bill Denny –  Attorney-General of South Australia
 John Doyle – Chief Justice of the Supreme Court of South Australia
 John Finnis – legal scholar and philosopher
 Francis Robert Fisher – Judge of the Federal Court of Australia, Chancellor Flinders University
 Regina Graycar – Emeritus Professor of Law School, University of Sydney
 Hermann Homburg – Attorney-General of South Australia
 Elliott Johnston – Communist activist and Justice of the Supreme Court of South Australia
 Len King – South Australian Attorney-General; Chief Justice of the Supreme Court of South Australia
 Robert Lawson – Attorney-General of South Australia
 Chris Kourakis – Chief Justice of the Supreme Court of South Australia
 Bruce Lander – South Australia's first Independent Commissioner Against Corruption
 G. C. Ligertwood – Judge of the Supreme Court of South Australia
 Brian Martin – Chief Justice of the Supreme Court of the Northern Territory
 Robin Millhouse – lawyer, politician, Justice of the Supreme Court of South Australia; Chief Justice of Kiribati and Nauru
 Roma Mitchell – lawyer, first female Queen's Counsel in Australia (1962); Justice of the Supreme Court of South Australia; first female superior court judge in the British Commonwealth (1965)
 George Murray – Chief Justice of South Australia
 Mellis Napier – Chief Justice of the Supreme Court of South Australia
 Rosemary Owens – Dean of Law at the University of Adelaide Law School
 Angas Parsons – former judge of the Supreme Court of South Australia and former Attorney-General of South Australia
 Geoffrey Reed – Judge in the Supreme Court of South Australia; the first director-general of ASIO
 Len Roberts-Smith – former Justice of the Supreme Court of Western Australia
 Paul Rofe – former South Australian Director of Public Prosecutions
 Colin Rowe – Attorney-General of South Australia
 Reginald Rudall – Attorney-General of South Australia
 Chris Sumner – Attorney-General of South Australia
 Margaret White – first female judge of the Supreme Court of Queensland

Medicine and science

Nobel laureates
 William Lawrence Bragg – physicist, Nobel laureate with his father (William Henry Bragg) "for their services in the analysis of crystal structure by means of X-rays"
 Howard Florey – pharmacologist, Nobel laureate (Physiology or Medicine, 1945) "for the discovery of penicillin and its curative effect in various infectious diseases"
 Robin Warren – pathologist, Nobel laureate (Physiology or Medicine, 2005), for the "discovery of the bacterium Helicobacter pylori and its role in gastritis and peptic ulcer disease"

Medicine

 Raymond Begg – orthodontist
 Henry Fry – physician and anthropologist
 Basil Hetzel – authority on iodine deficiency
 Rory Hume – dentist
 Tareq Kamleh – doctor who joined Islamic State of Iraq and the Levant
 Loretta Marron  – CEO of Friends of Science in Medicine
 Helen Marshall - vaccinologist
 Helen Mayo – pioneer in women's and children's health
 Henry Simpson Newland – surgeon
 Nicola Spurrier – SA Chief Public Health Officer
 Philip Nitschke – pro euthanasia advocate

Science and mathematics

 Herbert Basedow – anthropologist, geologist, politician, explorer and medical practitioner
 Warren Bonython – conservationist, explorer, author, and chemical engineer
 Keith Briggs – mathematician
 Henry Brose – physicist
 Helen Caldicott – physician and anti-nuclear advocate
 Herbert Condon – ornithologist
 Constance Davey – psychologist
 Margaret M. Davies – herpetologist
 Anthony C. Hearn – computer scientist
 Tim Jarvis – environmental scientist
 Norman Jolly – forest researcher
 Rodney Jory – physicist
 Abdul Karim – soil scientist
 Aubrey Lewis – first professor of psychiatry at the Institute of Psychiatry
 Trevor McDougall – physical oceanographer and climate researcher 
 Brian Morris – molecular biologist
 Keith Nugent – physicist
 Mark Oliphant – nuclear physicist
 Ian Plimer – professor and global warming critic
 Hugh Possingham – mathematical ecologist
 Lindsay Pryor – botanist and founding designer of the Australian National Botanic Gardens
 Roy Robinson – forest researcher
 Nagendra Kumar Singh – National Professor, Dr. B.P.Pal Chair, Indian Council of Agricultural Research
 Reg Sprigg – geologist and conservationist; discovered Ediacara biota
 Ted Strehlow – Australian anthropologist
 Andy Thomas – first Australia-born professional astronaut to enter space
 Cecil Edgar Tilley – petrologist and geologist
 Norman Tindale – Australian anthropologist, archaeologist, entomologist and ethnologist

Sports

 Max Basheer – football administrator
 Leonidas Bott – cricketer
 Matthew Cowdrey – swimmer; Australia's most successful Paralympian
 Collier Cudmore – Olympic rower and gold medal winner
 Albert Curtis – tennis player
 Hannah Davis – Olympic medal winning sprint canoer
 Moya Dodd – soccer official and player
 Annette Edmondson – Olympic cyclist and bronze medal winner at 2012 Summer Olympics
 Jaime Fernandez – three time Olympic rower in the Men's Eight (1992, 1996 and 2000), winning a silver medal in 2000
 David Fitzsimons – middle-distance runner 
Amber Halliday – rower
 Juliet Haslam – hockey player and Olympic gold medalist
Marguerite Houston – Olympic rower 
 James McRae – world champion and Olympic medal winning rower
Chris Morgan – rower, world champion, and Olympian
 Darren Ng – professional basketball player for the Adelaide 36ers
 Kate Slatter – Olympic rower; won gold at Atlanta 1996 and a silver at Sydney 2000
Tim Willoughby – Olympic rower

Administration

Chancellors

Vice-chancellors

Faculty

Nobel laureates
Sir William Bragg – physicist, Nobel laureate (Physics, 1915) with his son  William Lawrence Bragg  "for their services in the analysis of crystal structure by means of X-rays"
J. M. Coetzee – acclaimed  South African novelist and Nobel laureate (Literature, 2003); retired to Adelaide and honorary visiting research fellow in the Discipline of English

Law

Leo Blair – father of British Prime Minister Tony Blair; law lecturer at the University of Adelaide while Tony was a child
William Jethro Brown – professor of law
Hilary Charlesworth – feminist international law scholar
Norval Morris – U.S. law professor
Marcia Neave – Judge of the Supreme Court of Victoria
D. P. O'Connell – international law professor
John Salmond – professor of law and judge of the Supreme Court of New Zealand

Science

Natural sciences

Noel Benson – geologist
Lawrence A. Frakes – geologist and palaeoclimatologist
Martin Glaessner – geologist and palaeontologist
Victor Gostin – geologist
Maciej Henneberg – physical anthropologist, anatomist 
Walter Howchin – geologist
Arthur Mills Lea – entomologist
Cecil Madigan – explorer and geologist
Sir Douglas Mawson – Antarctic explorer and geologist
Ian Plimer – geologist and noted global warming critic
Ralph Tate – botanist and geologist
Charles Rowland Twidale – geomorphologist
Michael J. Tyler – herpetologist
Frederic Wood Jones – naturalist and anthropologist

Mathematicians

 Keith Briggs – mathematician, formerly on the staff of the Physics Department
Gavin Brown – mathematician, former vice chancellor of Adelaide and Sydney Universities
Charles E. M. Pearce – applied mathematician
Renfrey Potts – Adelaide's first professor of applied mathematics
George Szekeres – mathematician known for the Erdős–Szekeres theorem
Ernie Tuck – applied mathematician
Mathai Varghese – pure mathematician, Elder Professor of Mathematics, Australian Laureate Fellow (2018)

Physicists

Derek Abbott – physicist and engineer; pioneered the first terahertz radiation (T-ray) program in Australia; led the early development of a branch of game theory known as Parrondo's paradox. He is also involved in the Somerton Man case.
Rod Crewther – physicist; former PhD student of the Nobel prize winner Murray Gell-Mann
Sir Kerr Grant – Elder professor of physics 1911–1948
Bert Green – former PhD student of the Nobel Laureate Max Born; the "G" in "BBGKY"
Kenneth G. McCracken – physicist and former director of CSIRO
Tanya Monro – physicist and Federation Fellow (2008)
Albert Percival Rowe – Vice-Chancellor, physicist; previously radar pioneer in Britain
Anthony William Thomas – Elder professor of physics; South Australian Scientist of the Year 2014

Medicine

Caroline Crowther – professor of Women's and Children's Health
Edward Charles Stirling – physiologist, politician and advocate for women's suffrage
Sir Joseph Cooke Verco – physician and conchologist

Humanities

Neal Blewett – academic, politician and diplomat
Tristram Cary – composer of the Dalek theme tune for Doctor Who
Brian Castro – novelist
Robert Champion de Crespigny – industrialist
Alexander Downer – former Minister for Foreign Affairs
Keith Hancock – historian
Graeme Hugo – demographer and Federation Fellow (2002)
Ken Inglis – journalist and historian
Frank Cameron Jackson – philosopher
Jill Jones – poet
Charles Jury – poet
Gavan McCormack – orientalist
Sir Leslie Melville – inaugural professor of economics at age 27; later vice-chancellor of the Australian National University
Sir William Mitchell – philosopher
Sir Archibald Grenfell Price – historian and politician
George Rudé – Marxist historian
J. J. C. Smart – philosopher
J. I. M. Stewart – novelist
Randolph Stow – novelist
Hugh Stretton – historian and sociologist
Andrew Taylor – poet
Ghil'ad Zuckermann – linguist

Other

Barry Brook – climate scientist and advocate of nuclear power
Adrian Cheok – electrical engineer, roboticist
Alan Cooper – ancient DNA expert and Federation Fellow (2004)
Paul Davies – Professor of Natural Philosophy, Templeton Prize winner (1995)
Guy Debelle – economist and former Deputy Governor of the Reserve Bank of Australia
Tim Flannery – palaeontologist, Australian of the Year
Fay Gale – geographer; vice-chancellor of University of Western Australia (1990–1997)
Elizabeth Grant – architect and anthropologist
Geoff Harcourt – economist
Peng Shi – engineer
Peter Sutton – anthropologist

References

People
Adelaide
 
 
University